Stichtoptychus is a genus of beetles in the family Ptinidae. There are about 13 described species in Stichtoptychus.

Species
These 13 species belong to the genus Stichtoptychus:

 Stichtoptychus agonus Fall, 1905 i c g b
 Stichtoptychus aurantiacus White g
 Stichtoptychus elegans White g
 Stichtoptychus elongatus White g
 Stichtoptychus fulgidus White g
 Stichtoptychus megalops White g
 Stichtoptychus mexambrus Spilman, 1971 g
 Stichtoptychus ocellatus White g
 Stichtoptychus ornamentus White g
 Stichtoptychus platyops White g
 Stichtoptychus rubidus White g
 Stichtoptychus vittatus White g
 Stichtoptychus volutus White g

Data sources: i = ITIS, c = Catalogue of Life, g = GBIF, b = Bugguide.net

References

Further reading

 
 
 
 
 

Ptinidae